The Tyugyuene ( or Тюгене; , Tügüöne) is a river in Yakutia (Sakha Republic), Russia. The river marks the border between Gorny and Kobyaysky Districts in a stretch of its middle course. 

The name of the river is based on the Evenk word "tagin" (тагин), meaning "swamp".

Course  
The Tyugyuene is a left tributary of the Lena. It heads first a roughly northern direction to the east of the Lungkha in its upper course, then it bends northeastwards in its middle course across the Central Yakutian Lowland, changing again to northwards. There are small lakes in the broad floodplain of the lower course of the river, and it meanders strongly before reaching the Lena floodplain, vast and filled with lakes, to the east of the Sitte. in some stretches the banks are high, with a cliff-like appearance. Finally it meets the Lena  from its mouth. Its confluence is at the Khatyng-Tumusakh arm, by the village of Khaptagay, near Sangar on the facing bank.

Tributaries 
The river freezes between mid October and the first half of May. In some stretches it freezes to the bottom.

Flora and fauna
The vegetation of the Tyunyuene basin is mainly spruce and larch taiga, dense in some stretches of the upper course. In the floodplain the coniferous forest gives way to birch and willow thickets. Since there is little human presence in the area, Eurasian eagle-owl, elk, forest reindeer, roe deer, wolf, hare, sable and muskrat are common in the river basin.

See also
List of rivers of Russia
Reindeer in Russia

References

External links 
Fishing & Tourism in Yakutia

Rivers of the Sakha Republic
Central Yakutian Lowland